The Sudbury transmitting station is a facility for telecommunications and broadcasting 
transmission at Sudbury, England. They have antennas attached at various heights. It is situated 14 miles WSW of Ipswich at a site height of 70m. All 6 Digital TV MUXES are transmitted from Sudbury using an omnidirectional pattern at an ERP of 100 kW. Originally Sudbury was a B group transmitter but in order to accommodate the digital transmissions it went E group then, at its 700MHz clearance in August 2018, it ended up a K group (or wideband). However, most B group, E group and wideband aerials will continue to work fine on it (see graph).

Services available from this site

Digital radio

Digital television

 Aerial group K is required to receive all channels.

Before switchover

† Low power transmission from Sudbury B.

Analogue television

Aerial group: B
Polarisation: horizontal

See also
List of masts

References

External links
Info and pictures of Sudbury transmitter including historical power/frequency changes and present co-receivable transmitters.
Entry at the Transmission Gallery
Sudbury Transmitter at thebigtower.com

Transmitter sites in England